Face Yourself (stylized in all caps) is the third Japanese studio album by South Korean boy band BTS released on April 4, 2018, through Universal Music Japan and Def Jam Recordings. The album contains Japanese versions of songs previously released on the group's second Korean studio album Wings (2016), and the Love Yourself: Her (2017) extended play (EP), as well as three new, original Japanese-language tracks: "Don't Leave Me", "Let Go", and "Crystal Snow". Its debut at number 43 on the Billboard 200 made it the third-highest-charting Japanese album in the history of the chart.

Background and release
The album was announced on February 1, 2018, along with an April 4 release date and details for three limited editions. A tentative tracklist revealed new Japanese recordings of the songs "Go Go" and "Best of Me" from the band's 2017 Korean EP Love Yourself: Her, as well as the inclusion of "Crystal Snow", originally released back in December 2017 as part of a triple A-side single album with the Japanese versions of "Mic Drop" and "DNA". The completed tracklist was released on March 8. That same day, "Don't Leave Me" was announced as the opening theme song for Japanese drama Signal, a remake of the 2016 South Korean television series of the same name. A preview of the song aired on March 15, causing it to chart on the Billboard Japan Hot 100 prior to its official release—it peaked at number 25.

The Japanese translations for "Blood Sweat & Tears", "DNA", "Not Today", "MIC Drop", "Go Go", and "Crystal Snow" were done by Japanese rapper and arranger KM-MARKIT.

Editions 
Four versions of the album were made available for purchase: three Limited editions, and a CD-only Regular edition. The Type A and B versions both included a 32-page booklet, and featured exclusive content viewable on Blu-ray and DVD respectively. Type C included a 68-page booklet, while the Regular edition contained a 24-page booklet. All albums share a standard track listing.

Commercial performance 
The album debuted at number one on Oricon's Daily CD Album chart. It remained there for seven consecutive days, and ranked at number one on the Weekly Album chart with over 282,000 accumulated units sold, breaking a six-year-five-month-long record previously held by KARA, for the highest first-week sales by a Korean artist on the Oricon chart. This made it the highest-grossing album by a male artist on the Oricon chart for 2018 at the time. The album ranked at number 12 on the daily chart on its eighth day of charting, but surged back up over the course of the following weeks, reaching as high as number two. It spent thirteen successive weeks on the Oricon chart, with 324,381 accumulated units sold, 
and became BTS' first Japanese album to receive Platinum certification from the RIAJ on May 10. Oricon announced in June, that Face Yourself and BTS had made the top ten of their "Album Ranking" and "Artist Sales Ranking" charts for the first half of 2018, coming in at fourth and sixth respectively. BTS was the only Korean artist to enter both charts, and the highest ranked international artist. Tower Records Japan reported the album was the second best-selling album by a Korean artist in Japan for 2018.

On January 14, 2019, the album was awarded Double Platinum certification by the Recording Industry Association of Japan (RIAJ) for selling over 500,000 copies. It was the first album by a Korean act to achieve this since KARA's Super Girl in December 2011.

Singles 
Following the album's release, "Don't Leave Me" entered Oricon's Weekly Digital Singles chart at number 28, with 4,611 digital copies sold for the period dated April 2–8. "Let Go" debuted at number 40 on the Billboard Japan Hot 100, and entered South Korea's Gaon component Download Chart at number 63. In February 2021, the song was certified Silver by the RIAJ for surpassing 30 million streams in Japan.

Four of the album's singles ranked on the Billboard World Digital Song Sales chart in the US. "Dont Leave Me" debuted atop the chart with 9,000 sales, earning the band its record seventh number-one, while "Let Go" followed at number two, and "Intro: Ringwanderung" and "Outro: Crack" entered at numbers four and five respectively.

Accolades 
The album was nominated for and won Album of the Year and Best 3 Albums in the Asia category at the 2019 Japan Gold Disc Awards.

Track listing

Original

Limited Edition Type A·B

Charts

Weekly

Monthly charts

Year-end charts

Sales and certifications

Release history

References

2018 albums
BTS albums
Def Jam Recordings albums
Hybe Corporation albums